Ayman Al-Salek (born in Syria) is a Syrian television actor and voice actor.

Early life
He was born in Syria and work with Venus Center for Dubbing since in many of anime and cartoon and he work in many series Syrian TV and stages.

Business

TV series 
gadr al zaman.
al thoban (the snick).
al dakila.

Plays 
Canon al thani
Cinderella

Dubbing roles 
Detective Conan
Pokémon (Venus Center version)
Slam Dunk - Ryota Miyagi, Hikoichi Aida, Mitsuyoshi Anzai, Nozomi Takamiya
Naruto – Kakashi Hatake , Shikamaru Nara , Dosu Kinuta , Teuchi (ep 52)
The Legend of the North Wind
Blue Blink – Nitch
Honō no Tōkyūji: Dodge Danpei – 
Odin: Photon Sailer Starlight
The Sylvester & Tweety Mysteries – Sylvester (Venus Center version)
Tiny Toon Adventures – Buster Bunny
Dragon Ball – Muten Roshi
Dragon Ball Z – Muten Roshi, Dodoria
Digimon Tamers – Guilmon
Samurai 7 – Katayama Gorobei
Bomberman B-Daman Bakugaiden – Dr. Gray Bomber
Honō no Dōkyūji: Dodge Danpei
Secret of Cerulean Sand
Idol Densetsu Eriko – Shinya Uchida
Soar High! Isami
The Powerpuff Girls – Professor Utonium (Venus Center version)
The Jungle Book as Sura , CHIL , bacchus
Double Dragon
The Bots Master
Topo Gigio as Kato
Tanoshii Willow Town
Goal FH
SWAT Kats: The Radical Squadron - Commander Ulysses
Bruno the Kid
Ultraforce

References

Living people
Syrian male television actors
Syrian male voice actors
Syrian male stage actors
20th-century Syrian male actors
21st-century Syrian male actors
Place of birth missing (living people)
Year of birth missing (living people)